The Evil Experiment by Jude Watson is the twelfth in a series of young reader novels called Jedi Apprentice. The series explores the adventures of Qui-Gon Jinn and Obi-Wan Kenobi prior to Star Wars: Episode I – The Phantom Menace.

Plot
Jenna Zan Arbor is a mad woman. She kidnaps Jedi Master Qui-Gon Jinn, using him to investigate the Force .  Meanwhile, Obi-Wan Kenobi and Astri Oddo look for a cure, while also searching for Qui-Gon. Along the way, they meet other characters, such as Cholly, Weez and Tup, and a bounty hunter named Ona Nobis. Obi-Wan uses clues from Uta S'orn's son to track them from Nobis' home planet of Sorrus to Simpla-12, where he finds Cholly, Weez and Tup. He also finds the bounty hunter Ona Nobis, who easily matches the young apprentice's strength.

At Simpla-12, Obi-Wan teams up with Adi Gallia and Siri Tachi before preparing to break into Zan Arbor's hideout and rescue Qui-Gon. However, it will not be an easy task, for Zan Arbor's laboratory is nearly impregnable.

External links
Amazon.com Listing
Official CargoBay Listing
TheForce.net review

2001 British novels
2001 science fiction novels
Star Wars: Jedi Apprentice
Star Wars Legends novels
English novels